Charles "Chuck" Evans (April 16, 1967 – October 12, 2008) was an American football fullback who played for the Minnesota Vikings and the Baltimore Ravens.  He retired after the 2000 NFL season after playing in the NFL for eight years.

Early years
Evans went to Glenn Hills High School in Augusta, Georgia and went to college at Clark Atlanta University

NFL career
Evans might be best known for being the starting fullback for the 1998 Minnesota Vikings which scored the most points by a team (556) in a season in NFL history. He played the fullback position, which required him to block, catch the ball out of the back field, and every once in a while carry the ball.

His best year statistically was his first with the Baltimore Ravens in 1999.  He had 38 carries for 134 yards and 32 receptions for 235 yards and a touchdown.  He won a Super Bowl ring with the Ravens in 2000.  Around the NFL he was considered among the top in the league at his position.

Professional career

Minnesota Vikings
Evans was selected by the Vikings in the 11th round of the 1992 NFL Draft.  He was drafted from Clark Atlanta University, a Division II school. He went on to play in three games as a rookie and became a full-time player in his second year.  Charles thrived as a role player and became one of offensive coordinator Brian Billick's favorite players. He was a key part of the record breaking 1998 Minnesota Vikings offense that set the record for most points in a season (556).

Baltimore Ravens
After a record breaking year in 1998, Brian Billick was given the head coaching job of the Baltimore Ravens. A few players, including Chuck Evans, decided to follow him. In 1999, Evans had his most productive year offensively, and the newly coached team finished with an 8–8 record.  Evans only participated in one game in the 2000 season, but earned a ring as the team went on to win Super Bowl XXXV.

Death
Chuck Evans died on October 12, 2008, in Sparks MD, of heart failure. He was 41 years old.

Career statistics

References

  NFL Scoring Records. NFL.com. Accessed April 26, 2007.
 Charles Evans Stats. databaseFootball.com. Accessed April 26, 2007.
1999 Ravens. databaseFootball.com. Accessed April 26, 2007.

External links
 Chuck Evans passes away

1967 births
2008 deaths
American football fullbacks
Baltimore Ravens players
Clark Atlanta Panthers football players
Minnesota Vikings players
Players of American football from Augusta, Georgia